A Quiet Life is a 2010 Italian neo-noir film directed by Claudio Cupellini. It entered the competition at the 2010 Rome International Film Festival, in which Toni Servillo was awarded for Best Actor.

Plot
Antonio de Martino is living as Rosario Russo with his wife Renate and their young son Mathias in an idyllic place near Wiesbaden running a hotel and restaurant. He is wanted back in his home country of Italy and too many people have marked to kill him. For fifteen years, he has lived as a respected member of the town and a versatile cook. One day in his little hotel, his first son Diego with his friend Edoardo comes to stay for a couple of days. They are planning to assassinate a manager of a waste incineration plant. What seemed peaceful with consistent pacing turns into chaos. He murders and disposes Diego's friend after he claims to know Rosarios identity. Diego reveals his father's identity to his backers. Getting doubts he tries to save his father's life but while trying to flee he is killed by Italian gang members. Antonio leaves his wife and son for their safety and is again on the run, looking back impassively Antonio boards a bus.

Cast 
Toni Servillo: Rosario Russo / Antonio de Martino
Marco D'Amore: Diego
Francesco Di Leva: Edoardo
Juliane Köhler: Renate
Maurizio Donadoni: Claudio
Leonardo Sprengler: Mathias
Alice Dwyer: Doris

References

External links

2010 films
Italian drama films
2010 drama films
Italian neo-noir films
Films directed by Claudio Cupellini
2010s Italian films
Films set in Germany